Saluda may refer to any of the following in the United States:
 Saluda Township, Jefferson County, Indiana
 Saluda, Indiana
 Saluda, North Carolina
 Saluda Grade, once the steepest main-line railroad grade in the U.S.
 Saluda County, South Carolina
Saluda, South Carolina, county seat
 Saluda, Virginia
 Saluda River, in South Carolina
Saluda Lake, reservoir on the upper river
Little Saluda River
 Saluda (steamship), a riverboat which exploded on the Missouri River
 Saluda, a brand name of cymbals and drums; see cymbal manufacturers